Riku Toivo (born July 25, 1989) is a Finnish professional ice hockey player who is currently playing for Kärpät in the SM-liiga.

Career statistics

References

1989 births
Finnish ice hockey right wingers
HC Temirtau players
Hokki players
Kiekko-Laser players
Oulun Kärpät players
Living people
Sportspeople from North Ostrobothnia